The Freedom Foundation of Minnesota (FFM) is a conservative think tank based in Minnesota. The group states that it "actively advocates the principles of individual freedom, personal responsibility, economic freedom, and limited government." Annette Meeks founded the organization in 2006 and currently serves as CEO. The Freedom Foundation of Minnesota founded Minnesota Watchdog, an online news service. The organization is a member of the State Policy Network.

References

External links
 Official website
 Organizational Profile – National Center for Charitable Statistics (Urban Institute)

Organizations established in 2006
Organizations based in Minnesota
Think tanks based in the United States
2006 establishments in Minnesota
Conservative organizations in the United States